Richard Skinner (by 1506 – buried on 12 August 1575) was an English politician.

He was a member (MP) of the Parliament of England for Barnstaple in 1558. He was once a mayor and when running for Barnstaple he won over William Salusbury.

References

1575 deaths
English MPs 1558
Year of birth uncertain
Members of the Parliament of England (pre-1707) for Barnstaple